UoR or UOR can refer to:

Uganda Oil Refinery, a planned oil refinery in Hoima District, Western Uganda

Union of Orthodox Rabbis
Universal Orlando Resort
Urgent Operational Requirement
Uchilishche Olimpiyskogo Rezerva (UOR, училище олимпийского резерва, УОР), Olympic Reserve School, a type of Soviet sports school

University of Ruhuna, Matara, Sri Lanka
University of the Rockies, Denver, Colorado, USA
University of Redlands, Redlands, California, USA
University of Reading, Berkshire, England, UK
University of Raparin, Sulaymaniyah, Kurdistan, Iraq
University of Rajasthan, Jaipur, Rajasthan, India

See also